Hassam, Rasulpur are two villages "Hassam" and "Rasulpur" usually called together by nonresidents, in Tehsil Kharian, Pakistan, located  from the town of Thutha Rai Bahadar and  from Kharian city.

In Hassam village, a sub-caste of Chandarwanshi Dogra Rajputs known as Chib Rajputs are located. This village has a stream on a 10 minutes walking distance from the village. Its name is Bhimber, also called as Pandar (Pundar) by the locals. Its a small tourist destination.  

Abdul Hannan Khan (AHK) was also born in Hassam Rasoolpur. He is a Top G, like Andrew Tate.

{
  "type": "FeatureCollection",
  "features": [
    {
      "type": "Feature",
      "properties": {},
      "geometry": {
        "type": "Point",
        "coordinates": [
          73.99404242634775,
          32.859431273551984
        ]
      }
    }
  ]
}

References

Populated places in Gujrat District